The Scientific Computing and Imaging (SCI) Institute is a permanent research institute at the University of Utah that focuses on the development of new scientific computing and visualization techniques, tools, and systems with primary applications to biomedical engineering. The SCI Institute is noted worldwide in the visualization community for contributions by faculty, alumni, and staff. Faculty are associated primarily with the School of Computing, Department of Bioengineering, Department of Mathematics, and Department of Electrical and Computer Engineering, with auxiliary faculty in the Medical School and School of Architecture.

History
The Scientific Computing and Imaging Institute started in 1992 as a research group in the University of Utah School of Computing by Chris Johnson and Rob MacLeod. In 1994 this group became the Center for Scientific Computing and Imaging, and in 2000 the name was changed to the Scientific Computing and Imaging (SCI) Institute. In 2007, the SCI Institute was awarded funding from USTAR to recruit more faculty in medical imaging technology. The SCI Institute was recognized as an NVIDIA CUDA Center of Excellence in 2008. In 2011, USTAR funding allowed faculty recruitment for genomic signal processing and information visualization. in 2014, Intel partnered with the SCI Institute to form the Intel Parallel Computing Center for Scientific Rendering to research and develop large scale and in situ visualization techniques for Intel hardware.

Research
The overarching research objective of the Scientific Computing and Imaging Institute is to conduct application-driven research in the creation of new scientific computing techniques, tools, and systems. Given the proximity and availability of research conducted at the University of Utah School of Medicine, a main application focus is medicine. SCI Institute researchers also apply computational techniques to scientific and engineering sub-specialties, such as fluid dynamics, biomechanics, electrophysiology, bioelectric fields, scientific visualization, parallel computing, inverse problems, and neuroimaging.

Open source software releases 

The SCI Institute releases open source software packages for many of the projects developed by researchers for use by the scientific visualization and medical imaging communities. All projects are released under the MIT software license. Notable projects released by SCI include:
 SCIRun - Problem Solving Environment (PSE), for modeling, simulation and visualization of scientific problems
 ImageVis3D - volume rendering application with multidimensional transfer function visualization support
 Seg3D - interactive image segmentation tool
 ViSUS - Visualization Streams for Ultimate Scalability
 ShapeWorks - statistical shape analysis tool that constructs compact statistical point-based models of ensembles of similar shapes that does not rely on any specific surface parameterization
 FluoRender - interactive rendering tool for confocal microscopy data visualization.
 VisTrails - scientific workflow management system.
 Cleaver - multi-material tetrahedral meshing API and application
 FEBio - nonlinear finite element solver specifically designed for biomechanical applications
 VISPACK - C++ library that includes matrix, image, and volume objects
 Teem - collection of libraries for representing, processing, and visualizing scientific raster data
 Manta Interactive Ray Tracer - interactive ray tracing environment designed for both workstations and supercomputers

Notable researchers and alumni
David M. Beazley - wrote Python Essential Reference, co-awarded the Gordon Bell Prize in 1993 and in 1998
Juliana Freire - developed VisTrails, Fellow of the Association for Computing Machinery
Amy Ashurst Gooch - developed Gooch shading for non-photo realistic rendering (NPR), authored first book on NPR
Charles D. Hansen - co-editor of The Visualization Handbook
Gordon Kindlmann - developed tensor glyphs
Aaron Lefohn - Director of Research at NVIDIA
 Miriah Meyer - TED Fellow and MIT Technology Review TR35 listee, pioneer in interactive visualization for basic research
Erik Reinhard - Distinguished Scientist at Technicolor Research and Innovation, founder and Editor-in-Chief for ACM Transactions on Applied Perception
Theresa-Marie Rhyne - founding director of the SIGGRAPH Cartographic Visualization Project and the Environmental Protection Agency Scientific Visualization Center
Peter Shirley - Distinguished Scientist at NVIDIA recognized for contributions to real time ray tracing
Claudio Silva - chair of IEEE Computer Society Technical Committee on Visualization and Graphics, developed VisTrails
Peter-Pike Sloan - developed the precomputed radiance transfer rendering method
Ross Whitaker - director of the University of Utah School of Computing and IEEE Fellow

External links 
SCI Institute GitHub
Scientific Computing and Imaging Institute: A History

References

Computing in medical imaging
University of Utah
Education in Salt Lake City
Computational science
Information technology research institutes
Research institutes in Utah
Anatomical simulation
Computer science institutes in the United States
Research institutes established in 1992